CER1 or Cer1 may refer to :
 Cerberus (protein), a human protein
 Caenorhabditis elegans Cer1 virus, a nematode retrovirus